The brown goshawk (Accipiter fasciatus) is a medium-sized bird of prey in the family Accipitridae found in Australia and surrounding islands.

Description
Its upperparts are grey with a chestnut collar; its underparts are mainly rufous, finely barred with white. Thus it has similar colouring to the collared sparrowhawk but is larger. The flight is fast and flexible. Females are noticeably larger: adult males weigh , and adult females, .

Distribution and habitat
The brown goshawk is widespread through Australia, Wallacea, New Guinea, New Caledonia, Vanuatu and Fiji. In Australia, it is found mainly in eucalypt forests and woodlands, as well as farmland and urban areas. In the Pacific, it mainly inhabits rainforest. It was also found on Norfolk Island to about 1790, and this may be another undescribed subspecies. However, the lack of specimens from Norfolk Island (1 historical skin and 9 subfossil bones is all the material that has been found) means that no genetic test can be conducted.

Feeding
Brown goshawks feed mainly on other medium-sized birds, while small mammals such as rats and rabbits are also taken. Brown goshawks often hunt near farmland or wetlands, where birds such as ducks, cockatoos and pigeons are plentiful. Smaller prey such as finches, pipits and fairy-wrens are also preyed on, right up to birds the size of domestic fowls and even large, aggressive birds such as currawongs and kookaburras. Bats, small reptiles, amphibians, and large insects are also occasionally eaten.

The main methods of catching prey are still-hunting, by which the goshawk waits on a hidden perch until prey comes within striking distance, and flying through undergrowth attempting to flush out small prey. Less often, goshawks will stoop on prey from above, or even chase small mammals on foot.

When a brown goshawk is discovered by other birds, smaller species panic and flee for cover, while larger birds such as ravens, crows and magpies will aggressively mob it until it leaves the area.

Breeding
It nests in tall trees on a platform of sticks and twigs lined with green leaves.  The clutch size is usually three, sometimes two or four. The incubation period is about 30 days, with chicks fledging about 31 days after hatching.

Subspecies
There are twelve described subspecies:
 A. f. fasciatus (nominate) - (Vigors et Horsfield, 1827)
 A. f. buruensis - Stresemann, 1914
 A. f. didimus - (Mathews, 1912)
 A. f. dogwa - Rand, 1941
 A. f. helmayri - Stresemann, 1922
 A. f. natalis - (Lister, 1889)
 A. f. polycryptus - Rothschild et Hartert, 1915
 A. f. savu - Mayr, 1941
 A. f. stresemanni - Rensch, 1931
 A. f. tjendanae - Stresemann, 1925
 A. f. vigilax - (Wetmore, 1926)
 A. f. wallacii - (Sharpe, 1874)

References

External links 

 BirdLife Australia Profile

brown goshawk
Birds of prey
Birds of the Lesser Sunda Islands
Birds of New Guinea
Birds of New Caledonia
Birds of Vanuatu
Diurnal raptors of Australia
Birds of prey of Oceania
brown goshawk